The Belfast to Bangor line (known simply as the Bangor line by NI Railways) is a railway line in Northern Ireland, originally part of the Belfast & County Down Railway. All services are operated by NI Railways, the only operator for Northern Ireland (NI). Unlike the rest of the United Kingdom, no railway in NI is part of the National Rail network and none is owned by Network Rail. Services run every half-hour, with extra services at peak times.

Nearly all NIR services on this line continue on through Great Victoria Street and terminate at Portadown or Newry, stopping at stations in between. Trains usually run between Portadown and Bangor.

Rail Air Link

The Belfast-Bangor Line is part of the key link into Belfast city centre. Trains run from Belfast Great Victoria Street to Sydenham for planes from George Best Belfast City Airport.

Museum rail access

The Odyssey & Titanic Quarter

Passengers can alight at Titanic Quarter station for the Odyssey Arena and the Titanic Quarter.

References 

Railway lines in Northern Ireland
Transport in Belfast
Transport in County Down
5 ft 3 in gauge railways